The SousVide Supreme Water Oven is the first PID controlled, self-contained sous-vide cooking device designed specifically for home use. The product, launched in November 2009, was developed by Drs. Michael and Mary Dan Eades of Eades Appliance Technology, LLC.

The SousVide Supreme was developed due to the increasing popularity of sous vide cooking. Due to the expensive equipment costs (upwards of several thousand dollars), cooking SousVide had largely been inaccessible  to home cooks. The SousVide Supreme delivers temperature precision within 1 °F or .5 °C.

Company history
Eades Appliance Technology, LLC (EAT) was founded in 2009 by Dr. Michael and Mary Dan Eades along with their family. EAT is the parent company of SousVide Supreme and oversees all product developments and operations for the brand line of sous vide products.

The SousVide Supreme water oven came about in response to the rising popularity of sous vide cooking for home cooks.

In 2010 the company expanded its global footprint, launching its product line into the UK  and Europe and then more broadly. As of 2017 SousVide Supreme water ovens are sold in approximately 28 territories, regions, or countries around the globe.

References

External links
Julia Moskin "Sous Vide Moves From Avant-Garde to Countertop" NY Times 2009
"Sous Vide Cooking with Heston Blumenthal" Serious Eats 2009
 
 Popular Science
 Wired 
 NY Times

Companies based in Broomfield, Colorado
Cooking appliance brands
American brands